Felipe Yáñez (born 25 January 1953) is a Spanish former professional racing cyclist. He rode in two editions of the Tour de France and nine editions of the Vuelta a España.

Major results

1973
 1st 
1977
 1st Stage 3 Vuelta a Aragón
 7th GP Villafranca de Ordizia
1978
 2nd GP Llodio
 3rd Overall Vuelta a Aragón
1st Stage 3
1979
 1st Stage 4b Vuelta a Cantabria
 3rd Overall Setmana Catalana de Ciclisme
 7th Overall Vuelta a España
1st  Mountains classification
1st Stage 3
 7th Overall Tour of the Basque Country
1980
 1st Circuito de Getxo
 1st Stage 4 Tour of the Basque Country
 1st Stage 2b Vuelta a Cantabria
 7th Overall Volta a la Comunitat Valenciana
1981
 1st Stage 5 Vuelta a Asturias
 8th Clásica de San Sebastián
1982
 3rd Circuito de Getxo
 4th Trofeo Masferrer
1983
 1st  Overall Vuelta a los Valles Mineros
 2nd Overall Vuelta a Burgos
1st Stage 2
 5th Overall Tour of the Basque Country
1984
 1st  Mountains classification, Vuelta a España
 3rd Klasika Primavera
 9th Overall Setmana Catalana de Ciclisme
1st Stage 2
1985
 1st Stage 4a Vuelta a Murcia
 1st Stage 7 Vuelta a Castilla y León
 9th Subida al Naranco
 10th Clásica de San Sebastián
1986
 1st  Overall Setmana Catalana de Ciclisme
1st Stage 2
 1st Stage 17 Vuelta a España
 3rd Overall Vuelta a los Valles Mineros
1987
1st Stage 9 Vuelta a España
1988
 1st Subida a Txitxarro

References

External links
 

1953 births
Living people
Spanish male cyclists
People from Ciudad Real
Sportspeople from the Province of Ciudad Real
Cyclists from Castilla-La Mancha